Littoridina is a genus of small freshwater snails with a gill and an operculum, aquatic gastropod mollusks in the family Cochliopidae.

Species
Species within the genus Littoridina include:
 Littoridina adamsi (Preston, 1912)
 Littoridina angustiarum Preston, 1915
 † Littoridina bossii L. S. Morton [in Morton & Herbst], 2003 
 † Littoridina conica Wesselingh, 2006 
 † Littoridina crassa (Etheridge, 1879)
 Littoridina crosseana (Pilsbry, 1910)
 † Littoridina elongata Wesselingh, 2006 
 Littoridina faminensis Preston, 1915
 Littoridina forsteri Blume, 1958
 Littoridina gaudichaudii Souleyet, 1852
 † Littoridina gavriloffi L. S. Morton [in Morton & Herbst], 2003 
 Littoridina inconspicua Haas, 1938
 Littoridina limosa Preston, 1915
 Littoridina lioneli Preston, 1915
 Littoridina manni Baker, 1913
 Littoridina miaulis Marcus & Marcus, 1965
 Littoridina microcona F. G. Thompson & Hershler, 1991
 Littoridina orcutti (Pilsbry, 1928)
 † Littoridina pebasana (Conrad, 1874)
Littoridina piscium Orbigny, 1835 - syn. Hydrobia piscium
Littoridina pusilla Haas, 1949
Littoridina siolli Haas, 1949
Species brought into synonymy
 Littoridina aperta Haas, 1955: synonym of Heleobia aperta (Haas, 1955) (original combination)
 Littoridina australis (d’Orbigny, 1835): synonym of Heleobia australis (d'Orbigny, 1835)
 Littoridina australis nana Marcus & Marcus, 1965: synonym of Heleobia australis nana (Er. Marcus & Ev. Marcus, 1963)
 Littoridina castellanosae Gaillard, 1974: synonym of Heleobia castellanosae (Gaillard, 1974) (original combination)
 Littoridina charruana (d’Orbigny, 1840): synonym of Heleobia charruana (d'Orbigny, 1840)
 Littoridina chimbaensis Biese, 1944: synonym of Heleobia chimbaensis (Biese, 1944) (original combination)
 Littoridina cumingii (d'Orbigny, 1835): synonym of Heleobia cumingii (d'Orbigny, 1835) (superseded combination)
 Littoridina cuzcoensis Pilsbry, 1911: synonym of Heleobia cuzcoensis (Pilsbry, 1911) (original combination)
 Littoridina frenata Pilsbry, 1935: synonym of Zetekina frenata (Pilsbry, 1935) (original combination)
 Littoridina hatcheri Pilsbry, 1911: synonym of Strobelitatea hatcheri (Pilsbry, 1911) (original combination)
 Littoridina isabelleana (d'Orbigny, 1840): synonym of Heleobia isabelleana (d'Orbigny, 1840)
 Littoridina lacustris Haas, 1955: synonym of Heleobia lacustris (Haas, 1955) (original combination)
 Littoridina languiensis Haas, 1955: synonym of Heleobia languiensis (Haas, 1955) (original combination)
 Littoridina limariensis Biese, 1944: synonym of Heleobia limariensis (Biese, 1944) (original combination)
 Littoridina loaensis Biese, 1947: synonym of Heleobia loaensis (Biese, 1947) (original combination)
 Littoridina martensi Pilsbry, 1935: synonym of Zetekina martensi (Pilsbry, 1935) (original combination)
 Littoridina opachensis Biese, 1947: synonym of Heleobia opachensis (Biese, 1947) (original combination)
 Littoridina ortoni Pilsbry, 1924: synonym of Heleobia ortoni (Pilsbry, 1924) (original combination)
 Littoridina parchappii (d'Orbigny, 1835): synonym of Heleobia parchappii (d'Orbigny, 1835)
 Littoridina popoensis (Bavay, 1904): synonym of Heleobia popoensis (Bavay, 1904)
 Littoridina profunda Haas, 1955: synonym of Heleobia profunda (Haas, 1955) (original combination)
 Littoridina santiagensis Biese, 1944: synonym of Potamolithus santiagensis (Biese, 1944) (original combination)
 Littoridina saracochae F. Haas, 1955: synonym of Heleobia saracochae (F. Haas, 1955) (original combination)
 Littoridina sphinctostoma Abbott & Ladd, 1951: synonym of Texadina sphinctostoma (Abbott & Ladd, 1951) (original combination)
 Littoridina stiphra Haas, 1955: synonym of Heleobia stiphra (Haas, 1955) (original combination)
 Littoridina tenuipes (Couper, 1844): synonym of Littoridinops tenuipes (Couper, 1844) (superseded combination)
 Littoridina transitoria Biese, 1947: synonym of Heleobia transitoria (Biese, 1947) (original combination)
 Littoridina vestita Haas, 1955: synonym of Heleobia vestita (Haas, 1955) (original combination)
 † Littoridina woodringi Pilsbry, 1934: synonym of † Zetekina woodringi (Pilsbry, 1934)  (new combination)

References

External links
 Eydoux J.F.T. & Souleyet L.F.A. (1852). Voyage autour du monde exécuté pendant les années 1836 et 1837 sur la corvette La Bonite commandée par M. Vaillant. Zoologie, Tome Deuxième. 664 pp., Paris (Arthus Bertrand)
 Conrad, T. A. (1874). Remarks on the Tertiary clay of the Upper Amazon with descriptions of new shells. Proceedings of the Academy of Natural Sciences of Philadelphia. 1874: 25-32

 
Cochliopidae